The Earth Day Special is a television special revolving around Earth Day that aired on ABC on April 22, 1990. Sponsored by Time Warner, the two-hour special featured an ensemble cast addressing concerns about pollution, deforestation, and other environmental ills.

Several cutaways are made to famous fictional characters watching events unfold and discussing what can be done to save the planet.

This special was one of Jim Henson's final performances as Kermit the Frog prior to his death later that year, as well as one of Jeff Bergman's first as Bugs Bunny following the death of Mel Blanc the year prior.

Plot

The episodic narrative, consisting of several individual skits threaded together, focused on an ailing Mother Earth (Bette Midler), who falls from the sky and faints, and is rushed to the hospital where she is attended to by Doogie Howser (Neil Patrick Harris) and two other doctors (James Brolin and Dana Delany). This special is watched by a married couple named Vic (Danny DeVito) and Paula (Rhea Perlman), and features a host of contemporary celebrities and characters, including Bugs Bunny, The Muppets, Emmett "Doc" Brown, and E.T.

Cast
 Bette Midler as Mother Earth
 Danny DeVito as Vic
 Rhea Perlman as Paula
 Dan Aykroyd as Vic's Buddy
 Mary Kay Bergman as Allison
 Mayim Bialik as Kid
 Tempestt Bledsoe as Vanessa Huxtable
 Jonathan Brandis as Doug
 James Brolin as Doctor
 Chevy Chase as Vic's Buddy
 Kevin Costner as Bartender
 Rodney Dangerfield as Bachelor #3 (Dr. Vinny Boombatz)
 Geena Davis as Kim
 Dana Delaney as Doctor
 Rick Ducommun as Hospital Security Guard
 Jane Fonda as Helen
 Nika Futterman as Giulia
 Morgan Freeman as Walter Samson
 Dan Gauthier as Bachelor #2
 Edan Gross as Kid
 Dustin Hoffman as Everylawyer
 Dom Irrera as Fan
 Michael Keaton as Charles McIntyre
 Jack Lemmon as Coach Stewart
 Rick Moranis as Vic's Buddy
 Edward James Olmos as Hospital Director
 Pat Riley as Bachelor #1
 Meryl Streep as Concerned Citizen
 Robin Williams as Everyman
 Robert Wuhl as Fan

TV and Movie characters

Back to the Future
 Christopher Lloyd as Dr. Emmett Brown

Cheers
 Kirstie Alley as Rebecca Howe
 Ted Danson as Sam Malone
 Kelsey Grammer as Dr. Frasier Crane
 Woody Harrelson as Woody Boyd
 John Ratzenberger as Cliff Clavin
 George Wendt as Norm Peterson

The Cosby Show
 Lisa Bonet as Denise Huxtable Kendall
 Bill Cosby as Cliff Huxtable
 Keshia Knight Pulliam as Rudy Huxtable
 Phylicia Rashad as Clair Huxtable
 Raven-Symoné as Olivia Kendall
 Malcolm-Jamal Warner as Theo Huxtable

Doogie Howser, M.D.
 Neil Patrick Harris as Dr. Doogie Howser

Ghostbusters
 Harold Ramis as Elon Spengler (brother of Egon Spengler)

The Golden Girls
 Bea Arthur as Dorothy Zbornak
 Estelle Getty as Sophia Petrillo
 Rue McClanahan as Blanche Devereaux
 Betty White as Rose Nylund

Married... with Children
 Christina Applegate as Kelly Bundy
 Amanda Bearse as Marcy Rhoades
 David Faustino as Bud Bundy
 Ed O'Neill as Al Bundy
 Katey Sagal as Peggy Bundy

Murphy Brown
 Candice Bergen as Murphy Brown

Saturday Night Live
 Martin Short as Nathan Thurm

Appearing as themselves
 Downtown Julie Brown
 Heavy D
 Michael Douglas
 Isaac Hayes
 Ice-T
 Magic Johnson
 Quincy Jones
 Kid 'n Play
 Jim Lange
 Queen Latifah
 Tone Lōc
 Melanie Mayron
 Dennis Miller
 Fresh Prince
 Dr. Carl Sagan
 Barbra Streisand
 Donna Summer
 Alex Trebek

Muppet performers
 Kevin Clash as Alligator
 Dave Goelz as Elderly Frog
 Jim Henson as Kermit the Frog
 Jerry Nelson as Robin the Frog
 David Rudman as Iguana

Voices
 Jeff Bergman as Bugs Bunny, Porky Pig, Tweety
 Don Pardo as Weekend Update Announcer (uncredited)

References

External links
 

1990 in the environment
1990 television films
1990 films
1990 television specials
1990s American television specials
Back to the Future (franchise) mass media
Cheers
The Cosby Show
Crossover television
Environmental television
Ghostbusters
The Golden Girls
Looney Tunes television specials
The Muppets television specials
Films scored by Patrick Williams
Films with screenplays by Armyan Bernstein
Television episodes with live action and animation
Time travel in television
Television episodes directed by James Burrows
Television shows directed by Dwight Hemion
Television shows directed by Jim Henson
E.T. the Extra-Terrestrial
1990s American films